Gautam Malkani is a journalist for The Financial Times, and the author of the novel Londonstani which Dutch writer Robert Vuijsje described as the worst book of the year.  He has worked on the FT's UK news desk in London as well as in the Washington bureau. He is currently an associate editor on the FT Weekend Magazine, after a spell on the newspaper's Business Life section.

He was born in Hounslow, London on 27 August 1976.  Malkani's mother was a Ugandan of Indian descent. He studied Social and Political Sciences at Christ's College, Cambridge. Malkani currently resides in London.

References

External links
Guatam Malkani's Website
HarperCollins UK author page
Video trailer for Londonstani

1976 births
Living people
21st-century English novelists
Alumni of Christ's College, Cambridge
British Asian writers
British business and financial journalists
English male journalists
English male novelists
21st-century English male writers